Oldřich Šváb  (1944–2020) was a Czech-Swiss football coach who managed the Bangladesh national football team in 1993.

Bangladesh 

Asked to work with the Bangladesh national team in 1993 by Juan Antonio Samaranch, then president of the International Olympic Committee, Swab took the Bengal Tigers to the 1993 South Asian Games, not making it past the group stage and finishing sixth in the six-team cup. Following the tournament, a story published in a local newspaper stated that while Swab was in Farmgate, a man came to him, glimpsed the gold chain in his shirt, and exclaimed "This is your gold, where is our gold?" It is unknown whether the news piece was true or an erroneous report.

During his stint as Bangladesh coach, the Swiss manager was known for giving his players honey and dropping players in good form for unknown purposes.

References 

1944 births
2020 deaths
Expatriate football managers in Bangladesh
Bangladesh national football team managers
Swiss football managers
Swiss people of Czech descent
Czech football managers
Czech expatriate football managers
Expatriate football managers in Bhutan
Expatriate football managers in the Bahamas
People from Roudnice nad Labem
Czech footballers
FK Teplice players
FC Aarau players
Czechoslovak emigrants to Switzerland
FC Basel managers
Grasshopper Club Zürich managers
Sportspeople from the Ústí nad Labem Region